The 2021-22 Malian Première Division was the 55th season of the highest level of professional football in Mali. The championship was contested by 18 teams, starting in November 2021 and finishing in July 2022. Stade Malien were the holders going into the season following their 23nd title in the 2020-21 season, but lost the title to Djoliba AC, who won their 23rd title and drew level with Stade Malien in overall championships won.

Overview
Unlike the 2020-21 season, which had two pools of 10 teams and a championship stage, the league went back to an 18 team home-and-away schedule for the 2021-22 season. The reduction from 20 clubs to 18 clubs meant that only two clubs (Afrique Football Elite and US Bougouba) were promoted from the second-tier to replace the four relegated teams from 2020-21.

AS Bakaridjan, Djoliba AC, and USC Kita all mounted strong title challenges and remained towards the top of the table throughout the season, but Djoliba AC eventually accumulated an eight-point lead and won the title with two games left. Djoliba AC also beat AS Real Bamako in the Malian Cup final to complete the league-cup double. Despite finishing 5th, AS Real Bamako qualified for the 2022-23 CAF Confederation Cup by finishing runners-up in the cup. CS Duguwolofila, US Bougouba, AS Olympique de Messira and AS Douanes de Sikasso were relegated to the second-tier after finishing in the bottom four. They will be replaced by Binga FC and US Bougouni, who both won their respective Tournoi de Montée pools.

League table

References

Malian Première Division seasons